The 2005 Rochester mayoral election took place on November 8, 2005 in the city of Rochester, New York, United States. Robert Duffy was elected to succeed outgoing mayor William A. Johnson Jr. who chose not to seek a fourth term.

Candidates

Democratic
Robert Duffy - Chief of the Rochester Police Department
Wade Norwood - City councilman
Tim Mains - City councilman
Chris Maj - Business owner

Norwood had been selected by the party convention in April and was backed by local party elites such as Joe Morelle and David Gantt. However, he was defeated by Duffy in the primary election.

The primary election was held on September 13, 2005.

Republican
John Parrinello - criminal defense attorney

General Election

References

2005 New York (state) elections
History of Rochester, New York
Mayoral elections in Rochester, New York
Rochester